Robert Carter Wellford (August 27, 1853 – April 21, 1919) was an American politician who served in the Virginia House of Delegates, representing Lancaster and Richmond counties.

A descendant of Robert Carter I, he lived at historic Sabine Hall until his death, now a National Historic Landmark.

References

External links 

1853 births
1919 deaths
Democratic Party members of the Virginia House of Delegates
19th-century American politicians
20th-century American politicians